Hupperdange is a village in the commune of Clervaux, in northern Luxembourg.  , the village has a population of 197.

Heinerscheid
Villages in Luxembourg